Durham Education Center, also known as Durham Center was a public alternative school in Tigard, Oregon, United States. As of 2019, Durham Center became Creekside Community High School.

Academics
In 2008, 80% of the school's seniors received their high school diploma. Of 120 students, 96 graduated, 14 dropped out, and 10 are still in high school.

References

Tigard, Oregon
Public middle schools in Oregon
Alternative schools in Oregon
High schools in Washington County, Oregon
Public high schools in Oregon